The Stomatophorinae are a subfamily of parasites in the phylum Apicomplexa.

Taxonomy

There are ten genera in this subfamily: Albertisella, Arborocystis, Astrocystella, Beccaricystis, Chakravartiella, Choanocystoides, Craterocystis, Parachoanocystoides, Stomatophora and Zeylanocystis.

History

This subfamily was created by Bhatia in 1930.

Description

References

Bikont subfamilies
Conoidasida